Alison Young (born 29 May 1987 in Worcestershire, England)  is a British sailor. She competed in the Laser Radial class event at the 2012 Summer Olympics where she placed 5th.

At the 2016 Laser World Championships, she won gold in the laser radial class  and in doing so became the first British woman to become world champion in a solo Olympic dinghy class. Her best World Championship performance before this was 4th in 2012.

Young was one of the favourites going into the Rio 2016 Olympics, finishing 8th overall. After the event Young revealed that she had suffered a broken ankle eight weeks prior to the Olympics but she refused to use this as an excuse for not finishing higher.

She competed  at the 2020 Summer Olympics in the Women's Laser Radial class.

References

External links
 
 
 
 

1987 births
Living people
English sailors
Olympic sailors of Great Britain
British female sailors (sport)
Sailors at the 2012 Summer Olympics – Laser Radial
People from Wolverhampton
Sailors at the 2016 Summer Olympics – Laser Radial
Sailors at the 2020 Summer Olympics – Laser Radial